A bra bomb is a bomb worn by women suicide bombers. Hiding the explosives in a bra instead of a vest allows for the women to show their midriffs when searched. In 2007 a Tamil Tiger suicide bomber had explosives hidden in her bra. She blew herself up outside the office of a Tamil minister.

Most notable high-profile attack would be the suicide attack by Thenmuli Rajaratnam wearing a belt with explosives or a bra bomb used in the assassination of Indian Prime Minister Rajiv Gandhi by Liberation Tigers of Tamil Eelam (LTTE).

In the United States, complaints have been made by airline passengers against TSA for their intrusive checks for bra bombs, including the call for an apology and civil rights investigation from a woman who was required to remove her nipple piercings with pliers, and a mother who was told by Airport security to place her infant on the ground.

See also
Underwear bomb
Shoe bomb

References

Brassieres
Suicide weapons